United Left of Castile and León (IUCyL) is the Castilian-Leonese federation of the Spanish left wing political and social movement United Left. José María González is the current General Coordinator. The major member of the coalition is the Communist Party of Castile–León (PCCL, Castilian-Leonese federation of the PCE).

History
In the Castile and León elections of 2015 IUCyL gained 1 seat in the Cortes of Castile and León.

See also
United Left (Spain)
Communist Party of Aragon

References

External links
Official page

Castile and León
Political parties in Castile and León